is a four-part Japanese cyberpunk original video animation created by Noboru Ishiguro, written by Hiroyuki Hoshiyama and Emu Arii, and directed by Ishiguro, Ichiro Itano, Kenichi Yatagai, and Shinji Aramaki. The series debuted in 1985. It was originally titled  but the title was changed just before release.

The story follows Shougo Yahagi, a delinquent motorcyclist whose possession of a government prototype bike leads him to discover the truth about the city. Released on the VHS, Betamax, Laserdisc and VHD formats, the first part was a major commercial success in Japan upon release in 1985. It was also adapted into Robotech: The Movie (1986) in North America. The film's concept of a simulated reality has drawn comparisons to later films including Dark City (1998), The Matrix (1999) and Existenz (1999). It also inspired the video game 13 Sentinels: Aegis Rim (2019).

Plot
Megazone 23s story is set in the far future of the human race, after, in the early 24th century, various environmental issues rendered Earth uninhabitable, forcing humanity to leave in several massive colony ships, the titular Megazones. The story itself follows the population of Megazone Two Three, based on 1985's Tokyo, Japan, where the population has forgotten their status as space travellers.

Part I and II
The first two parts occur roughly 500 years after humanity left Earth, as the government attempt to hack into the civic computer, Bahamut, for their city, in order to use the city's benevolent artificial intelligence, known as EVE, to influence the people to help them in a near-endless war against the Dezalg, advanced humans from a rival Megazone.

Thrown into this is Shogo Yahagi, after he is given ownership of a strange experimental bike by an old friend of his. Over the course of the story, he discovers how false his world is, and eventually makes contact with the EVE Program, who enlists him to assist humanity in any way he can.
However, unfortunately, before he can do anything meaningful, the city's government become focused on the destruction of the Dezalg, and decide to terminate Shogo and EVE, who has fled into cyberspace.
In the end, Eve manages to save Shogo and his friends, sending them in Bahamut's system core to Earth as the battling ships are destroyed by an automated lunar defense system called ADAM, ending the conflict, at the price of an unknown number of people on both ships.

Part III
The third part occurs several centuries after this, with a hacker named Eiji Takanaka, who is scouted by a rebel group working against the teachings of a mysterious spiritual leader known as Bishop Won Dai. Sion, a high-ranking member of the rebel group, who work under the aegis of Orange Amusements, begins scouting Eiji, while also investigating a strange program called Project Heaven that the E=X Bureau, Won Dai's elite staff, are preparing.
Sion manages to confront Eiji as Orange attempt to stop whatever Project Heaven is, and, badly wounded, instructs Eiji to go to the lowest point in the city, finding the real, centuries-old, Eve Tokimatsuri, who was left in suspended animation, meant to be awoken by Shogo Yahagi.
She takes him to Bahamut, meeting the AI version of Eve from the previous two parts, while Sion manages to stop Orange from making the same mistake as several centuries before, using it to broadcast the E=X's master plan.
In the end, Eiji and Eve confront Won Dai, and he is slain, revealing he is actually Shogo Yahagi as he dies. Eve heads to the ADAM moonbase to shut down and destroy it, while also taking out the city's computer, finally beginning the final part of the plan enacted around a millennia before, while Eiji heads off to meet with his girlfriend Ryo to begin his life anew.

Cast

Part I

Part II

Part III

Production
Megazone 23 was conceived as a 12-episode television series set to air on Fuji TV, but it was changed to a direct-to-video project after the sponsors withdrew their support mid-production. According to Noboru Ishiguro, the end result was a "compilation movie" of already produced episodes. Megazone was not conceived as a multi-part story. As such, the original release of "Part I" lacks the subtitle that has been added to subsequent re-releases.

Original mecha designs for the OVA series were created by Shinji Aramaki, while character designs were made by Toshihiro Hirano and Haruhiko Mikimoto, who would provide Eve Tokimatsuri's character designer for all three parts. For "Part II", Yasuomi Umetsu was the character designer, and for "Part III", Hiroyuki Kitazume took over.

The original planned title was "Omega City 23," then "Vanity City" and "Omega Zone 23," but trademark issues compelled the producers to a title change. The number "23" was originally a reference to the 23 municipal wards of Tokyo. In the retroactive continuity established by Part III, the number refers to the 23rd man made city-ship, with Megazone 1 named "Big Apple." However, the title is pronounced "Megazone Two Three" as referenced by several reference books and anime magazines published during the release of the series, the Japanese Wikipedia entry, and even within the series itself in "Day of Liberation."

A 2017 ad on the Japanese crowdfunding platform Campfire listed that AIC is working on a remake and a new project in the series. Soon after, AIC announced that the project would be a remake of the series titled Megazone 23 SIN, and a sequel titled Megazone XI would also be in production with character designer Masahiko Komino. At AnimeJapan 2019, AIC announced that only Parts I and II of the original Megazone series would be remade in the reboot series.

Alternative versions
"Part I" was spliced with Super Dimension Cavalry Southern Cross by Carl Macek to create Robotech: The Movie in 1986.
The new cut reestablished Shogo's character as Mark Landry
 and included a new ending animated specifically for Robotech: The Movie.

The Japanese "International Edition" of Part 2 has an English-language voice cast that Carl Macek had orchestrated. The consequent adaptation rewrote Shogo as "Johnny Winters" and Yui as "Sue." This creates a continuity error, as the name that appears on her bike helmet remains unchanged. The International Edition also added a narration to the exclusive alternate footage from Robotech: The Movie; the retooled scene became an introduction to Part 2.

Releases
The first part was released on the VHS, Betamax, Laserdisc and VHD formats in 1985.

Megazone Part II International was released on laserdisc in Japan. It was not included in the out-of-print DVD Box Set, but was available as a bonus item to those who purchased all three installments individually. It was also released as a Region 2 DVD bundled with the Limited Edition of the PS3 game Megazone 23: Aoi Garland. Streamline Pictures released a straight-dubbed version of Part 1 in 1994. Streamline Pictures released an unedited dubbed version of Part 1 to VHS in 1995, which was released to DVD in 1998 by Image Entertainment. Streamline also planned on releasing the other two parts, but were unable due to a dispute with their distributor Orion Pictures. Manga Entertainment also released a dubbed version of Part 3 in the United Kingdom.

In 2004, ADV Films released each installment of the series with a newly produced English dub and the original Japanese language track. The 2004 editions also contained extensive liner notes on the development of Megazone 23. ADV released a complete collection in 2007. With the closure of ADV in 2009, the series is now out-of-print in the US. Megazone 23 was remastered onto Blu-ray in Japan, and released on November 27, 2015. AnimEigo launched a Kickstarter campaign for the release of the series in August 2019, similar to Bubblegum Crisis one before, and released the Megazone 23 Omega Edition Blu-ray Box in March 2021. It includes Megazone Part II International.

Reception and legacy
The first part was a major commercial success in Japan upon release in 1985, selling over 216,000 copies in Japan, mostly to video rental stores.

The anime received a positive English-language review from Australian magazine Hyper in 1996, calling it "Excellent" and rating it 8 out of 10. The reviewer said it "is one of the more original" sci-fi anime "to have hit these shores" and that, despite "a smaller budget," the art is "beautifully designed and finished." They said it is "a black and cynical look at mankind and technology" which makes it "perfect Cyberpunk fare."

Influence
Publisher ADV has compared and found many similarities between the Megazone 23 series and The Matrix (1999), but The Wachowskis have denied it was an influence during the development of the film series. Megazone 23 has also drawn comparisons to the films Dark City (1998) and Existenz (1999). It also heavily influenced the video game 13 Sentinels: Aegis Rim (2019).

Video games
Character and vehicles from Megazone 23 appear in Super Robot Wars D  for the Game Boy Advance.

In 2007, a video game based on the series, entitled Megazone 23: Aoi Garland, was released in Japan for the PlayStation 3.

References

External links

AnimeOnDVD review of the series
Timeline from the Eve Shrine
Megazone 23 on MAHQ
Part II International Edition intro clips (Originally from Robotech: The Movie)

1985 anime OVAs
1986 anime OVAs
1989 anime OVAs
Action anime and manga
ADV Films
Anime International Company
Anime with original screenplays
Artland (company)
Cyberpunk anime and manga
Manga Entertainment
Robotech